Filthy Gorgeous may refer to:

 "Filthy/Gorgeous", a song by Scissor Sisters
 Filthy Gorgeous: The Bob Guccione Story, a 2013 film